Barry Williams may refer to:

 Barry Williams (politician) (1928–2005), British boilermaker, trade unionist, and Communist
 Barry Williams (spree killer) (1944–2014), British spree killer
 Barry Williams (athlete) (born 1947), British hammer thrower
 Barry Williams (actor) (born 1954), American actor
 Barry Williams (rugby league) (active 1990–96), professional rugby league footballer
 Barry Williams (rugby union) (born 1974), Welsh international rugby union player
 Barry Williams (skeptic) (1938–2018), Australian skeptic
 "The Barry Williams Show", a song by Peter Gabrial on his album Up.